Top shelf may refer to:
 Top Shelf Productions, an American publishing company
 Top Shelf Radio, an Australian radio programme
 Topshelf Records, an American rock record label
 Top shelf magazine, meaning a pornographic magazine
 Topshelf (store), a Dutch chain of department stores
 Top-shelf liquor, generally the most expensive brands of liquor served in a bar or nightclub
 Thee Top Shelf, a short-lived but popular barter-based speakeasy type bar in Sacramento's Alhambra Triangle neighborhood between 2000 and 2004, famous for its adherence to vinyl-formatted soundscape and strict baseball- or C-SPAN-only live television policy (with other ambient video provided by blaxploitation and other vintage feeds); and a notable kitchen renowned for its genuine gumbos and five-alarm chilis.
 The upper section of netting on a Goal (ice hockey), between the crossbar and the horizontal backbar